Jan Lutomski (20 January 1937 – 30 December 2016) was a Polish freestyle swimmer. He competed in two events at the 1960 Summer Olympics.

References

External links
 

1937 births
2016 deaths
Polish male freestyle swimmers
Olympic swimmers of Poland
Swimmers at the 1960 Summer Olympics
Sportspeople from Poznań